The Royal School, Wolverhampton is a co-educational free school and sixth form for day and boarding pupils in Wolverhampton, West Midlands, England. It is the only state school of its type in the UK to have a Royal Charter and it has been a free school since September 2016. The school was previously a fee paying private school and it is now one of a handful of state boarding schools in the country.

History
The Royal School, Wolverhampton began life as The Wolverhampton Orphan Asylum.  It was founded in 1850 by John Lees, a local lock-manufacturer and freemason, after a cholera epidemic ravaged the town and left many children orphaned.  The orphanage was completely funded by voluntary subscription and was dedicated to the education and maintenance of children who had lost one or both parents.

The Royal Orphanage of Wolverhampton came into being in 1891 when Queen Victoria gave permission for the prefix 'Royal' to be used.  The charity carried on using this title until the late 1940s when King George VI permitted it to be re-styled The Royal Wolverhampton School.

The following decade saw a rapid decline in the number of pupils as the newly formed Welfare State took over some of the school's responsibilities.  The cost of caring for orphans also dramatically increased and so the constitution was controversially changed to allow the admission of fee-paying pupils.  Their proportion steadily grew to the extent that they eventually constituted around 90% of its students.

The school became a free school in September 2016.

Buildings and Facilities

The school's original premises were at 46 Queen Street, Wolverhampton.  In 1854 it moved to new buildings on Penn Road.  These have been greatly extended over the years but they still form the nucleus of the current school.

Hilda Hayward Swimming Pool
The original Hilda Hayward swimming pool was constructed in the 1970s with money donated by the Hayward Foundation.  It was named in honour of Sir Charles Hayward's wife who died during its construction.

This pool was destroyed in a fire in February 2005.  Its replacement, also called the Hilda Hayward swimming pool, cost £2.5 million and was opened by Prince Edward in September 2006.

The Hilda Hayward pool also provides facilities for the School's Elite Swim Club and Learn to Swim Programme, part of the Amateur Swimming Association.

Royal Patronage 
The school's patron is Prince Edward, the youngest son of Queen Elizabeth II. Prince Edward succeeded his grandmother, Queen Elizabeth The Queen Mother, in this role.

Forces bursaries 
The children of serving personnel in the British Army, Navy or Royal Air Force are afforded £1,000 a term per child of military personnel in order to help them pay for their children to board.

Eric Idle was an Orphan's scholarship holder and benefited from a forces bursary as his late father had been a former member of the RAF.

Extracurricular Activities

Sport 
The main sports on offer are athletics, basketball, football, cricket, rounders, netball and swimming.

CCF 
All pupils in Year 8 up until Year 10 are required to be a member of the Combined Cadet Force (CCF). Other students (Year 11 onwards) have the option to continue CCF sessions.

Notable people

Montagu Dawson, RAF group captain
Alice Dearing, swimmer
Edward Gopsill, lieutenant colonel
Gilbert Harding, broadcaster
Eric Idle, comedian
Tully Kearney, Paralympic Swimmer
Michael Kidson, schoolmaster
Kelly Massey Olympic 400m athlete
Philip Oakes, journalist
Jonathan Pedley, wine expert
Matthew Richards, Olympic swimmer
Tom Webster, cartoonist

References

External links

The Royal School, Wolverhampton official website
Profile on the Independent Schools Council website
Independent Schools Inspectorate Inspection Reports
 History of the Orphanage/School

Educational institutions established in 1850
1850 establishments in England
Boarding schools in the West Midlands (county)
Secondary schools in Wolverhampton
Church of England secondary schools in the Diocese of Lichfield
Church of England primary schools in the Diocese of Lichfield
Primary schools in Wolverhampton
Free schools in England